Anni Cermak (born 18 June 1940) is an Austrian gymnast. She competed in six events at the 1960 Summer Olympics.

References

1940 births
Living people
Austrian female artistic gymnasts
Olympic gymnasts of Austria
Gymnasts at the 1960 Summer Olympics
Place of birth missing (living people)